The Chapin Mesa Archeological Museum is an archaeological museum in Montezuma County, Colorado, United States. Situated within Mesa Verde National Park, it is one of the main features of the Mesa Verde Administrative District, a National Historic Landmark since 1987.

Museum Building and History 
Dating to 1922–1925, the Pueblo Revival museum building, designed and constructed during the tenure of archeologist and park superintendent Jesse L. Nusbaum, is an early example of "parkitecture" an informal name for park buildings intentionally designed to be aesthetically appropriate to and reflective of the natural environment and strong cultural traditions of the various natural parks.  It is one of six park buildings created from local buff sandstone with projecting wood beams ("vigas"). The museum's construction was funded by donations from John D. Rockefeller, Jr.

The museum is situated on Chapin Mesa on the Spruce Tree Loop, near Spruce Tree Canyon. The canyon rim behind the building offers a view of Spruce Tree House, one of the largest and best preserved cliff dwellings in the park.

Museum collections 
The museum offers a short film providing an overview of Mesa Verde National Park and the history of archeological work there as well as displays of artifacts including pottery, baskets, weavings, tools, household implements, and other archeological finds from the Mesa Verde region. It also features five dioramas that offer interpretations of prehistoric Mesa Verde and of the Ancestral Puebloans in their daily lives spanning a period from 13,000 BCE to 1200 CE. The dioramas were created by members of the Civilian Conservation Corps in the 1930s and are now themselves an important aspect of the park's history. In 2019, an initial thirty thousand dollar federal grant was awarded to the University of Colorado as part of the project for conserving the dioramas, upgrading the museum's display cases, and adding interactivity to exhibits. As part of the project to improve the exhibits, the IDIA Lab at Ball State University is developing an augmented reality mobile app. When downloaded to a visitor's mobile device, the app will be capable of superimposing digital figures over the existing dioramas to bring the exhibitions to life and to offer a fuller and more accurate depiction of the Ancestral Pueblo people.

Renovations 
As of October, 2021, the museum is temporarily closed to visitors for renovations.

See also
Frederick H. Chapin
National Park Service rustic "parkitecture"

References

External links
Archeological Sites at Mesa Verde
Spruce Tree House

Archaeological museums in Colorado
National Park Service museums
Mesa Verde National Park
National Park Service rustic in Colorado
Pueblo Revival architecture in Colorado